Power At Sea is a video game developed by Distinctive Software and published by Accolade in 1988 for the Commodore 64.

Gameplay
It is a simulation of the Battle of Leyte Gulf, in which the Japanese attempt to capture the Pacific during World War II. The player commands a battleship, an aircraft carrier, and a troop ship, to launch naval gun barrages against enemy cave emplacements and direct assault forces to capture beachheads in enemy-held territory.

Reception
In 1988, Dragon gave the game 3 out of 5 stars. A 1991 Computer Gaming World survey of strategy and war games gave it one star out of five, criticizing the game's abridged order of battle and arcade combat.

Reviews
Computer and Video Games - Apr, 1988
Zzap! - May, 1988
The Games Machine - May, 1988
ASM (Aktueller Software Markt) - Apr, 1988
ACE (Advanced Computer Entertainment) - May, 1988
Computer Gaming World - Dec, 1991

References

External links

Power at Sea at GB64
Review in Compute!'s Gazette

1988 video games
Accolade (company) games
Commodore 64 games
Commodore 64-only games
Distinctive Software games
Simulation video games
Single-player video games
Video games developed in Canada
World War II video games